The Waste Lands is the eighth studio album by British heavy metal band Venom. It is the last with bassist/singer Tony "Demolition Man" Dolan and also the last before the reunion of the classic Venom line-up from their first four albums, Welcome to Hell, Black Metal, At War with Satan and Possessed. Like the previous album, Temples of Ice, the album was originally supposed to be produced by ex-Child's Play producer Howard Benson, however he was once again unavailable so the band decided to stay with Kevin Ridley. The working title for this album was Kissing the Beast, but the band changed it when they got the album cover from Tari József (Aurea Aetas).

Track listing
All songs were written by Anthony Bray, Tony Dolan and Jeff Dunn.

Credits
 Tony "Demolition Man" Dolan – vocals, bass
 Jeff "Mantas" Dunn – guitar
 Steve White – guitar
 V.X.S. – keyboards and sound effects
 Anthony "Abaddon" Bray – drums
 Kevin Ridley - producer, engineer

References

1992 albums
Venom (band) albums
Albums produced by Kevin Ridley